Moreton Hall may refer to the following places in England:

 Moreton Hall, Bury St Edmunds, a country house and former school
 Moreton Hall Community Woods
 Moreton Hall, Warwickshire, a historic house in Moreton Morrell
 Moreton Hall School, Weston Rhyn, Oswestry, Shropshire
 Great Moreton Hall, a historic country house in Moreton cum Alcumlow, Cheshire
 Little Moreton Hall, a manor house near Congleton in Cheshire

See also
 Moreton House (disambiguation)